Kriter IV was a 66-foot waterline length trimaran which was sailed across the Atlantic Ocean in 1979. It was designed entirely of aluminum by Xavier Joubert as an extension of Eric Tabarly's Manureva and constructed by the French shipyard Constructions Mécaniques de Normandie (CMN) for Olivier de Kersauson.

It competed in the Route du Rhum in 1978, finishing fourth and achieving speeds of over 30 knots ( per hour).

See also
 List of multihulls

References

Trimarans
1970s sailing yachts
Sailing yachts built in France
Route du Rhum yachts